Amblyscirtes is a genus of skipper butterflies in the family Hesperiidae. The genus was erected by Samuel Hubbard Scudder in 1872.

Species

 A. aenus Edwards, 1878
 A. aesculapius Fabricius, 1793
 A. alternata (Grote and Robinson, 1867)
 A. anubis
 A. belli Freeman, 1941
 A. brocki
 A. carolina Skinner, 1892
 A. cassus Edwards, 1883
 A. celia Skinner, 1895
 A. elissa Godman, 1900
 A. eos (Edwards, 1871)
 A. exoteria (Herrich-Schäffer, 1869)
 A. fimbriata Plötz, 1882
 A. florus
 A. fluonia
 A. folia
 A. hegon (Scudder, 1863)
 A. linda Freeman, 1943
 A. nereus Edwards, 1876
 A. novimmaculatus
 A. nysa Edwards, 1877
 A. oslari Skinner, 1899
 A. patriciae
 A. phylace Edwards, 1878
 A. raphaeli
 A. reversa F. M. Jones, 1926
 A. simius Edwards, 1881
 A. texanae Bell, 1927
 A. tolteca Scudder, 1872
 A. vialis (Edwards, 1862)

Notes

References
 

Hesperiinae
Hesperiidae genera